Adam Ahmed Gemili (born 6 October 1993) is a British sprinter. He is the 2014 European champion at 200 metres, three-time European champion in the 4 x 100 metres relay, and part of the Great Britain team that won gold at the 2017 World Championships in the same event. He has finished fourth in the 200 metres at the 2016 Rio Olympic Games, and fourth and fifth in separate editions of the World Championships in the same event.

He was the first British Athlete to go sub-10 s in the 100 m and sub-20 s in the 200 m, and the first man of North African, Arab or Iranian heritage to break the ten second barrier in the 100 metres.

A silver medalist in the 100 metres and 4 × 100 m relay in the 2014 Commonwealth Games, Gemili is also a former World Junior champion at 100 m and European Under-23 champion at 100 m and 4 × 100 m relay.

He is a three-time national champion in the 200 metres.

Achievements
Gemili won a gold medal over 100 m at the 2012 World Junior Championships in Athletics in Barcelona. His winning time of 10.05 seconds established a new championship record, and is the second fastest ever run by a European junior, behind only Christophe Lemaitre (10.04). Having cleared the Olympic qualifying time with his 10.08 seconds in the 100 m in June 2012, Gemili competed at the 2012 Summer Olympics where he, after a poor start, came third in the semi-final in a time of 10.06 s, 0.04 s short of qualifying for the final.

He was selected to run the 200 m at the 2013 World Championships in Athletics. Having set a personal best in the first round, in the semi-final Gemili ran a time of 19.98, making him only the second British athlete, after John Regis, the third teenager (after Usain Bolt and Alonso Edward), and the ninth European athlete, to break 20 seconds in the event. 2013 was his first season training for the event.

Gemili won his first senior medal at the 2014 Commonwealth Games coming second to Jamaica's Kemar Bailey-Cole in the 100 m final in a time of 10.10 seconds. Two weeks later, Gemili took his first senior title, winning the 200 m at the 2014 European Athletics Championships, in an equal personal best of 19.98 (−1.6 m/s).

Gemili was overlooked for individual selection for the 2017 World Championships, following early season injury, but was included in the 4 x 100-metre relay team. Racing both heats and final, he won a historic gold medal as a member of the British quartet in a national and European record, lifting the team to third on the all-time list behind USA and Jamaica. The race was also notable as Usain Bolt's last race; third at the changeover, Bolt pulled up injured and was unable to finish.

Gemili is a member of Blackheath and Bromley Harriers Athletic Club, and also a former football player for Dagenham & Redbridge and Thurrock F.C. having spent seven years in the youth academy at Chelsea. Gemili is the only man of Middle Eastern descent to run the 100 m in under 10 seconds, and the first Briton to run both the 100 m in less than 10 seconds, and the 200 m in less than 20.

Early life
Gemili is of Iranian and Moroccan descent, which he considers to be "a very weird background for a sprinter." He is the first sprinter of either North African or Middle Eastern descent to break both the 10 second and 20 second barriers for 100 and 200 metres respectively At the age of eleven, Gemili attended Dartford Grammar School. He also attended Barking and Dagenham College where he studied for a BTEC Extended Diploma in Sport, and hoped to attend university at some point. After the 2012 Olympics he started studying Sports and Exercise Science with Human Biology at the University of East London, where he wrote his dissertation on the effect of particular warm-up exercises on sprinting performance. He is a member of Blackheath & Bromley Harriers.

Sprinting career

2011-15
Gemili won a silver medal over 100 m at the 2011 European Athletics Junior Championships in Tallinn, Estonia. He also helped the British squad to a silver medal in the 4 × 100 m relay. At the National Junior Athletic League Finals Gemili won the 200 m in 20.98, which was the fastest time by a European junior in 2011.

Gemili ran an Olympic qualifying time for the 100 m and won the Sparkassen Gala in Regensburg, Germany, on 2 June 2012, just over three weeks prior to the British track trials for the 2012 Summer Olympics. He beat his previous best time of 10.23 in the heats, running a time of 10.11 and then ran a time of 10.08 in the final. That time was the second fastest 100 m ever run by a British Junior, behind only Dwain Chambers (10.06 sec). At the time of his victory, James Dasaolu was the only one other British athlete to have met the Olympic qualifying time for the men's 100 m. Gemili was selected for the British 2012 Olympic 4 × 100 m relay team on 3 July 2012.

On 11 July 2012, Gemili finished first in the 100 m at the 2012 World Junior Championships in Athletics, winning the gold medal in a time of 10.05 seconds, breaking the championship record originally established by Darrel Brown in 2002. Besides breaking the British national junior record, Gemili's 10.05 ranks sixth all-time among juniors, behind only Brown, Jeffery Demps, Marcus Rowland, D'Angelo Cherry and Christophe Lemaitre.

He ran 10.11 in his first heat in the 100 m at the London 2012 Olympics, finishing second behind Asafa Powell. As he finished in the top three of the heat Gemili qualified for the next round but despite finishing third in his semi-final in a time of 10.06, he failed to make the final.

He qualified for the 2013 World Athletics Championships in Moscow for the 200 m. In his semi-final, he clocked a time of 19.98, the second fastest time ever by a Briton in that distance, having been bettered only by John Regis. He thus qualified for his first major final and finished 5th with a time of 20.08.

At the 2014 Commonwealth Games on 28 July 2014, Gemili finished second in a time of 10.10 seconds in the Men's 100 m final in a race won by Kemar Bailey-Cole of Jamaica.

2015-19
On 31 May 2015, he broke the 10-second barrier in the 100 m for the first time in his career, with a run of 9.97 seconds; however, the wind speed (+3.7 m/s) was above the legal wind limit.
On 7 July 2015, at the IAAF Diamond League meeting in Birmingham, he became the 100th man in history to break the 10-second barrier legally in the 100 m, again clocking 9.97 seconds (+2.0 m/s); however, he fell as he crossed the line, picking up a hamstring injury which would cause him to miss the 2015 World Championships. He is the one hundredth man to break 10 seconds.

Gemili qualified for the Men's 200 metres Final in Rio 2016. Gemili, Christophe Lemaitre, and Churandy Martina hit the finish line together. The photo finish revealed Lemaitre to be the bronze medalist, with only six thousandths of a second separating the three runners.
In the 2017 World Championships in London, Gemili won the Gold Medal in the 4 X 100m relay running the 2nd leg.

Gemili qualified for both the individual 100m and 200m at the 2019 World Athletics Championships in Doha, Qatar. He was eliminated in the 100m at the semi-final stage, missing out on qualification for the final via a photo finish. He narrowly missed out on a medal in the 200m final, leading the race coming off the bend but ultimately finishing in fourth place. He ran the first leg of the men's 4 × 100 m relay, winning a silver medal behind the United States in a new European record time of 37.36 seconds.

Off track, in November 2019 Gemili led a group of 20 British athletes including Mo Farah, Katarina Johnson-Thompson and Laura Muir who threatened to take legal action against the British Olympic Association regarding the interpretation of the International Olympic Committee's Rule 40 contained in guidelines which had been recently issued by the association. Rule 40 restricts use of Olympic-related terms in marketing by non-approved sponsors: the athletes argued that the BOA's interpretation of the rule was too restrictive regarding how they could promote their individual sponsors. In March 2020 the athletes reached an agreement with the BOA which would allow athletes more opportunities to promote their sponsors during and immediately before and after the Games. In July 2020, Gemili was announced as a board member of the track and field athletes' union, the Athletics Association.

Football career
Formerly a football player, Gemili played as a defender for Football League Two team Dagenham & Redbridge, and joined Thurrock on loan at the end of August 2011, where he made 12 appearances in the Isthmian League until 30 November.

He was previously a youth player at Chelsea from the age of eight onwards for seven years, and spent a year at Reading. His time had been split between athletics and football; he said of his potential dual careers in 2012, "I hope this year could be a turning point in helping me decide which sport to focus on, but it does depend on what I run this year."

In 2012, Gemili switched full-time to athletics.

Achievements

International competitions

1Time from the heats; Gemili was replaced in the final.

Circuit wins, and National championships
 Diamond League
 2016: London Anniversary Games (4x100m relay)
 2018: London (4x100m relay)
 2020: Stockholm BAUHAUS-galan (200m)
 British Athletics Championships
 200 metres: 2016, 2019, 2021

References

External links

 
 
 
 
 
 
 
 
 
 
  (2014)
 
 

1993 births
Living people
Footballers from Greater London
English footballers
Association football defenders
Athletes from London
English male sprinters
British male sprinters
Olympic male sprinters
Olympic athletes of Great Britain
Athletes (track and field) at the 2012 Summer Olympics
Athletes (track and field) at the 2016 Summer Olympics
Athletes (track and field) at the 2020 Summer Olympics
Commonwealth Games silver medallists for England
Commonwealth Games medallists in athletics
Athletes (track and field) at the 2014 Commonwealth Games
Athletes (track and field) at the 2018 Commonwealth Games
World Athletics Championships athletes for Great Britain
World Athletics Championships winners
World Athletics Championships medalists
European Athletics Championships winners
European Athletics Championships medalists
European Athletics Rising Star of the Year winners
World Athletics U20 Championships winners
British Athletics Championships winners
Chelsea F.C. players
Reading F.C. players
Dagenham & Redbridge F.C. players
Thurrock F.C. players
National League (English football) players
English people of Iranian descent
English people of Moroccan descent
Alumni of the University of East London
Medallists at the 2014 Commonwealth Games